Winthorpe may refer to:

Winthorpe, Lincolnshire, England
Winthorpe, Nottinghamshire, England